Dynamo, in comics, may refer to:

 Dynamo (Fox Feature Syndicate), a 1940s comic book character
 Dynamo, one of the T.H.U.N.D.E.R. Agents
 Captain Dynamo (character), a comic book superhero
 Crimson Dynamo, the name of several Marvel Comics characters
 Dynamo 5, a superhero team formed of the children of Captain Dynamo
 Dynamo Boy, an expelled member of the Legion of Super-Heroes
Dynamo Joe, a 1980s comic book series

See also
Dynamo (disambiguation)